The Government Dental College, was the first dental college in Karnataka, India.
It is an autonomous institute of government of India. The college is located in K.R. Market.

Colleges in Bangalore
Dental colleges in Karnataka
Educational institutions in India with year of establishment missing